Karikho Kri is a politician from Arunachal Pradesh state in India. He is a member of Arunachal Pradesh Assembly from Tezu in Lohit district. He comes from a tribe known as Mishmi.Tezu is a plain town with hills and a river surrounding it. He is an independent candidate and member of Arunachal Pradesh Legislative Assembly.

References

People from Tezu
Arunachal Pradesh MLAs 2019–2024
Living people
Year of birth missing (living people)
Arunachal Pradesh MLAs 2009–2014